HASC may refer to:

 Hebrew Academy for Special Children, in New York City
 Hierarchical administrative subdivision codes, codes to represent names of country subdivisions, such as states, province, regions
 Hindustan Aeronautics Limited S.C. (Hindustan Aeronautics Sporting Club) a football team in India
 Home Affairs Select Committee, a Committee of the House of Commons in the Parliament of the United Kingdom
 House Armed Services Committee, a standing committee of the United States House of Representatives